Calybe (Ancient Greek: Καλυβη means "rustic hut") may refer to the two distinct characters from Greek mythology:

 Calybe, a nymph who was a wife of the Trojan king Laomedon and the mother of Bucolion.
 Calybe, one of the follower of Dionysus in the Indian War.

Notes

References
 (Pseudo-)Apollodorus, The Library, with an English translation by Sir James George Frazer (1921). 2 volumes. Cambridge, MA: Harvard University Press; London: William Heinemann Ltd. .
 English translation available at the Perseus Digital Library.
 Greek text available from the same website.
 
 English translation available at the Topos Text Project.
 Greek text available at the Perseus Digital Library.

Nymphs
Maenads
Companions of Dionysus